Gilberto Ensástiga Santiago (20 July 1963 — 21 December 2020) was a Mexican politician affiliated with the Party of the Democratic Revolution. As of 2014 he served as Deputy of the LIX Legislature of the Mexican Congress representing the Federal District. 

He died from COVID-19 during the COVID-19 pandemic in Mexico.

References

1963 births
2020 deaths
People from Mexico City
Party of the Democratic Revolution politicians
Deaths from the COVID-19 pandemic in Mexico
Members of the Chamber of Deputies (Mexico) for Mexico City